Nils Peter Laberg Heitman (1874 – 1938) was a Norwegian physician and civil servant.

He was born in Bergen, Norway and graduated with the cand.med. degree in 1900. He was a chief physician from 1914, and was the director of the Norwegian Directorate for Medicine (Statens helsetilsyn) from 1930 to 1938.

References

1874 births
1938 deaths
Norwegian healthcare managers
Directors of government agencies of Norway
Physicians from Bergen
Civil servants from Bergen